Dysauxes fraterna is a moth of the family Erebidae. It was described by Nikolay N. Ignatyev and Vadim V. Zolotuhin in 2006. It is found in Armenia.

References

Syntomini
Moths described in 2006